Ollie is an unincorporated community in Edmonson County, Kentucky.

History
A post office called Ollie was established in 1898, and remained in operation until 1994. The community has the name of Ollie Easter, the mother-in-law of an early postmaster.

References

Unincorporated communities in Edmonson County, Kentucky